Julia Gregson (born 1947) is a British  writer of short stories and novels. Her first published short  story won Ryman's Literary Review Short story award. In 2009, her novel East of the Sun  won the Prince Maurice Prize for Literary Love stories, and the Romantic Novel of the Year Award by the Romantic Novelists' Association.

Biography

Personal life
At age 19, Gregson married an equally young academic who worked at Sydney University. The marriage ended in divorce after six years.

She began dating producer/writer Richard Gregson in the late 1970s, and the couple married in 1984. Together they had one daughter, Poppy. She has four stepchildren from her husband's previous marriages, including actress Natasha Gregson Wagner.

Widowed since 2019, Gregson lives in Monmouthshire, Wales.

Career
Julia Gregson was a journalist for Sungravure Magazines in Australia before becoming a  foreign correspondent in the  United States.  She went on assignments to Vietnam, India and Mexico. She started writing short-stories before publishing her first novel in 2004.

Bibliography
 The Water Horse (2004) aka Band of Angels (US title)
 East of the Sun (2008)
 Jasmine Nights (2012)
 Crossing Borders (2014)
 Monsoon Summer (2016)

References and sources

External links
 

Place of birth missing (living people)
Living people
21st-century British novelists
21st-century British women writers
British journalists
RoNA Award winners
1947 births
Women romantic fiction writers
British women novelists